Wuzhai is a county of northwestern Shanxi province, China. It is under the administration of Xinzhou City.

Climate
Wuzhai has a monsoon-influenced, humid continental climate (Köppen Dwb), with cold and very dry winters, and warm, humid summers. Due to the high elevation and dry climate, the diurnal temperature variation averages  annually.

References

www.xzqh.org 

County-level divisions of Shanxi
Xinzhou